The Oxford Dictionary of Saints by David Hugh Farmer is a concise reference compilation of information on more than 1300 saints and contains over 1700 entries. It is published by Oxford University Press. The first edition was published in 1978. A fifth revised edition was published in 2011.

References

Oxford dictionaries
1978 non-fiction books